The Ravailler was a French automobile manufactured only in 1907.  Possibly the first successful amphibious car, it was a 20 hp vehicle complete with steel hull, chain drive, and disc wheels with solid tires.

References
David Burgess Wise, The New Illustrated Encyclopedia of Automobiles.

Defunct motor vehicle manufacturers of France